Agriculture in Serbia is an important sector of the Economy of Serbia comprising 6.0% of GDP and is valued at 2.416 billion euros (as of 2017).

There is a total of 3,475,894 hectares of used arable land in Serbia, comprising 67.12% of total arable land available (including land under forest). Agricultural production is mostly present in northern province of Vojvodina on the fertile Pannonian Plain (45% of all used arable land), and the southern lowlands adjacent to the Sava, Danube and Great Morava rivers.

There has been a sharp decline in agricultural activity since 1948, when almost three-quarters of the population engaged in farming, to the present one-sixth. It is estimated that around 1.1 million people in Serbia (15.70% of total population) is employed on agricultural farms, with around 530,000 being employed in farms all-year long (as of 2018). As of 2018, there is a total of 564,542 agricultural farms in Serbia, of which the vast majority of 99.7% are traditional family farms.

Overview
Serbia produces various agricultural products, mostly grains, fruits and vegetables which constitute a significant part of its GDP and exports. Serbia is among the top five producers in the world of raspberries (127,011 tons as of 2018) and plums (430,199 tons as of 2018). It is also a significant producer of maize (6,158,120 tons, ranked 32nd in the world) and wheat (2,095,400 tons, ranked 35th in the world). The production of sugar beet (2,299,770 tons) and sunflower seeds (454,282 tons) meets domestic demand for sugar and vegetable oil and permits export of some 180,000 tons of sugar to the European Union.

Fruits
Fruit farms cover 182,922 hectares of arable land in Serbia (as of 2018). The following table gives a preview of prevalent planted fruit species by area and achieved production (as of 2018):

Grains
Grain farms cover around 1,702,829 hectares of arable land in Serbia (as of 2018), making 66.22% of total used arable land. The following table gives a preview of prevalent planted fruit species by area and achieved production (as of 2018):

Plants
Not including grains, there are various agriculture culters being planted on over 869,000 hectares of arable land in Serbia.

Among vegetable, watermelon and strawberry plants, 34,190 hectares that are grown outdoors are produced for use in fresh state, 12,083 hectares are grown outdoors for industrial processing and 3,843 hectares are grown in greenhouses.

Wine

Serbia is the 19th largest producer of wine in the world. The country has one of Europe's longest history of viticulture and belongs chronologically to the Old World wine producing countries.

There are 21,359 hectares of vineyards in Serbia (as of 2018), producing 198,183 tons of grapes annually (as of 2014), which position Serbia among the first 20 wine-producing countries in the world. The majority of production is dedicated to local wineries.

Major varieties include the Belgrade Seedless, Prokupac, Sauvignon, "Italian Riesling", Cabernet, Chardonnay, White and Red Burgundy, Hamburg, Muscat, Afus Ali, Vranac, Tamjanika, Krstac, Smederevka, and Dinka.

Livestock
As of 2018, the share of livestock in agricultural production of Serbia stood at 32.6%, with total livestock valued at 1.460 billion euros and annual production value of livestock products being around 450 million euros.

In the total structure of production value of livestock, pigs comprise the most (66.2%), followed by cattle (31.0%), poultry (14.4%) and sheep and goats with 8.4%. As of 2018, there are 23 million chickens, 3.3 million pigs, 1.8 million sheep, 881,000 cattle, 218,000 goats and 15,000 horses. Also, there is an estimated 914,000 beehives, 31,800 rabbits, 4,800 donkeys and small numbers of buffaloes and ostriches.

Education and Research in Agriculture
There are several faculties that offer tertiary education of agriculture to students:
 University of Belgrade Faculty of Agriculture in Zemun
 University of Novi Sad Faculty of Agriculture in Novi Sad
 University of Kragujevac Faculty of Agronomy in Čačak
 University of Niš Faculty of Agriculture in Kruševac

There are several scientific institutes with scope of their activities devoted to the development of agriculture:
 Institute for Medicinal Plant Research "Josif Pančić" in Belgrade
 Institute of Agricultural Economics in Belgrade
 Institute for Plant Protection and Environment in Belgrade
 Institute for Animal Husbandry in Belgrade
 Institute of Forestry in Belgrade
 Institute of Field and Vegetable Crops in Novi Sad
 Maize Research Institute "Zemun Polje" in Zemun
 Institute for Science Application in Agriculture in Belgrade
 Institute of Meat Hygiene and Technology in Belgrade
 Institute of Pesticides and Environmental Protection in Belgrade
 Institute of Agricultural Economics in Belgrade
 Fruit Research Institute in Čačak

The BioSense Institute in Novi Sad was established in 2015, to develop digital technology for agriculture in Serbia.

See also
 Economy of Serbia
 Serbian cuisine
 Danube Strategy

References

External links

 Анкета о структури пољопривредних газдинстава, 2018. – Структура, економска снага и маркетинг производа пољопривредних газдинстава at stat.gov.rs 
 Анкета о структури пољопривредних газдинстава, 2018. – Пољопривредна газдинства према типу производње и економској величини at stat.gov.rs 
 Анкета о структури пољопривредних газдинстава, 2018. – Радна снага и рад на пољопривредним газдинствима - стање и тренд at stat.gov.rs 
 Анкета о структури пољопривредних газдинстава, 2018. – Шта потврђује, шта оповргава и на шта указује at stat.gov.rs